Hucho is a genus of large piscivorous salmonid fish known as taimens (from Finnish  through Russian ), and is closely related to Pacific trout and lenoks (all belonging to the same tribe in the subfamily Salmoninae).  Native to the cold rivers and other freshwater habitats in Eurasia, they are threatened by overfishing and habitat loss.

Species
The currently recognized species in this genus are:

In addition, the Sakhalin taimen was formerly placed in this genus, but genetics and other evidence has shown that it belongs in its own monotypic genus as Parahucho perryi.

References

  The Eurasian Huchen, Hucho hucho: Largest Salmon of the World; By J. Holcík, K. Hensel, J. Nieslanik, L. Skácel

 
Taxa named by Albert Günther
Ray-finned fish genera
Species endangered by river-damming